MD-Douala International Airport  is an international airport located in Douala, the largest city in Cameroon and the capital of Cameroon's Littoral Region. With its 4 terminals and an average of 1.5 million passengers and 50,000 tonnes of freight per year it is the country's busiest airport. The airport is managed and partly owned (34%) by the company Aeroport du Cameroon (ADC) which also manages all other 13 airports on Cameroonian soil.

Runway 
Douala Airport has a single runway, 12/30, with a length of 2,880 m (9,448 ft). Between 1 and 21 March 2016, the runway was closed for upgrade works; all airlines switched operations to Yaoundé Airport during that period. This formed part of a renovation plan of 20 billion CFA (US$36,363,636 million), financed by the French Agency of Development, which targeted a two-stage renovation: first the airport's runway, and then its terminals and interior.

Statistics

Airlines and destinations

Passenger

Cargo

Accidents and incidents
4 March 1962: Caledonian Airways Flight 153 - all 111 people on board died
3 December 1995: Cameroon Airlines Flight 3701 - 71 out of 76 people on board died
5 May 2007: the Kenya Airways Flight 507 scheduled for Abidjan - Douala - Nairobi crashed in Mbanga Pongo near Douala international airport, two minutes after it took off from the airport. Although the weather was bad, the report from the Cameroonian civil aviation authority said the pilots were to blame for the crash. There were 114 fatalities, including 37 Cameroonians, 15 Indians and one American.

References

External links

 

Airports in Cameroon
Buildings and structures in Douala